Conus dianthus is a species of sea snail, a marine gastropod mollusk in the family Conidae, the cone snails, cone shells or cones.

These snails are predatory and venomous. They are capable of "stinging" humans.

Description
The size of the shell varies between 22 mm and 28 mm. The shell is rather abbreviately conical, pale pink, with irregular patches of orange. It shows rather distant revolving ridges and faint longitudinal striae, undulating across the ribs and forming thereon minute scales. The body whorl is obscurely coronated. The aperture is pink within.

Distribution

References

 Sowerby, G.B. Jr. (1882). Descriptions of new Species of Shells in the Collection of Mr. J. Cosmo Melvill. Proc. Zool. Soc. Lond. (1882): 117-121
 Puillandre N., Duda T.F., Meyer C., Olivera B.M. & Bouchet P. (2015). One, four or 100 genera? A new classification of the cone snails. Journal of Molluscan Studies. 81: 1-23

External links
 To World Register of Marine Species
 Cone Shells - Knights of the Sea

dianthus
Gastropods described in 1882